National Highway 716 ( NH 716 ).  it is In Tamilnadu To Chennai Near by NH 16  Junction,  In Maharashtra Mumbai Near by NH 48  Junction is Between

Chennai Renigunta route has been expanded to 4 lanes.

Route 

It starts at Chennai in Tamil Nadu and terminates at Kadapa in Andhra Pradesh.

Tamil Nadu
Chennai, Tiruvallu, Tiruttani - A. P. border.

Andhra Pradesh
T. N. border - Puttur, Tirupati, Mamanduru, Settigunta, Koduru, Pullampeta, Rajampet, Nandalur, Madhavaram, Vonimitta, Bhakarapet, Kadapa (Cuddapah), Kuarunipalli, Vallur, Thapetla, Kothapalli, Chidipirala, Pandillapalle, Thiparulu, Yerraguntla, Nidizivve, Chillamakuru, Muddanur, Tadipatri, Gooty, Guntakal, Bellary.

Junctions  

  Terminal near Chennai.
  near Puttur.
  near Tirupati.
  near Kadapa.
  near Tadipatri.
  near Muddanur.

See also 
 List of National Highways in India
 List of National Highways in Andhra Pradesh

References

External links 

 NH 716 on OpenStreetMap

National highways in India
National Highways in Tamil Nadu
National Highways in Andhra Pradesh